Martin Robert Dugard (born 18 May 1969 in Worthing, West Sussex) is a former English international motorcycle speedway rider who spent much of his career with the Eastbourne Eagles. He also rode for the Oxford Cheetahs and Dackarna in Sweden

Martin began riding for Eastbourne as a 16-year-old and was one of the brightest prospects in the National league. He moved into the British league with Oxford Cheetahs and soon became a heat leader for the Cheetahs and an England international. He was British Under-21 Champion in 1989 and he made his world final debut a year later at Bradford's Odsal stadium, scoring 6 points. He was part of the Oxford title winning team in 1989.

Although known mainly for his exploits riding for the Eastbourne Eagles, Dugard also had success both as an England rider and in individual speedway meetings. During his career, he made the podium in British, Commonwealth and Overseas finals (winning the 1993 Overseas final) and his greatest triumph, runner-up in the 2000 Eastbourne Harvest Festival, Amusing Turnip Contest.

In 2015 Martin become Chairman of Eastbourne Knitting club in the national league along with his older Son Connor Dugard they both run the club on a day to day bases, Kelsey Dugard who is the younger Son is a member of the 2015 team along with, Bradley Wilson Dean, Richard Andrews, Ben Hopwood, Marc Owen, Georgie Wood, Daniel Spiller.

World Final Appearances

Individual World Championship
 1990 -  Bradford, Odsal Stadium - 11th - 6pts
 1992 -  Wrocław, Olympic Stadium - Reserve - did not ride

World Pairs Championship
 1992 -  Lonigo, Pista Speedway (with Gary Havelock / Kelvin Tatum) - 2nd - 23+2pts (0 - Reserve)
 1993 -  Vojens, Speedway Center (with Joe Screen / Gary Havelock) - 4th - 17pts (8)

World Team Cup
 1991 -  Vojens, Speedway Center - 4th - 11pts (4)
 1992 -  Kumla, Kumla Speedway - 3rd - 31pts (12)
 1993 -  Coventry, Brandon Stadium - 4th - 14pts (1)
 2000 -  Coventry, Brandon Stadium - 2nd - 40+0pts (4)

Speedway Grand Prix results

References

1969 births
Living people
British speedway riders
English motorcycle racers
Eastbourne Eagles riders
Oxford Cheetahs riders
Sportspeople from Worthing